Kepo (Kepoq) is a Malayo-Polynesian language spoken on Flores in Indonesia.

References

Sumba languages
Languages of Indonesia